McMakin is a surname. Notable people with the surname include:

John McMakin (baseball) (1878–1956), American baseball player
John McMakin (born 1950), American football player
Roy McMakin (born 1956), American furniture maker, artist, and architect

See also
McMackin
McMaken